Phantasma may refer to:

Phantasm (disambiguation)

Music
Phantasma (Leon Bolier album), an album by Leon Bolier
Phantasma (Cemetery album)
PhantasmaChronica, an album by Korovakill under the name of Chryst
Phantasma (band), a heavy metal project comprising Charlotte Wessels, Georg Neuhauser, and Oliver Philipps

Games
BlazBlue: Chrono Phantasma, 2-D fighting game
Armored Core: Project Phantasma, 1997 video game for the Sony PlayStation
BlazBlue: Clone Phantasma, 2012 3D arena fighting game

Animals
Elysius phantasma, a species of moth of the family Erebidae found in French Guiana and Surinam
Eilema phantasma, a moth of the family Erebidae found in Madagascar
Chimaera phantasma, a species of fish in the family Chimaeridae found near Australia, China, Japan, North Korea, South Korea
Spalacopsis phantasma, a species of beetle in the family Cerambycidae
Asura phantasma, a moth of the family Erebidae that is found in India
Lemonia phantasma, a moth of the family Lemoniidae found from Spain up to Egypt and North Africa

Entertainment
Phantasma, kingdom in The Queen's Knight
Phantasma, a new attraction in Coney Island in Love Never Dies (musical)
Phantasma, a laughter prone musically talented ghost girl from the movie Scooby-Doo and the Ghoul School